Thomas Kearney (4 June 1923 – 16 January 1992) was an Irish épée and sabre fencer. He competed at the 1952 and 1960 Summer Olympics.

References

External links
 

1923 births
1992 deaths
Irish male épée fencers
Olympic fencers of Ireland
Fencers at the 1952 Summer Olympics
Fencers at the 1960 Summer Olympics
Irish male sabre fencers